The Central Board of Secondary Education (CBSE) is a national level board of education in India for public and private schools, controlled and managed by the Government of India. Established in 1929 by a resolution of the government, the Board was an experiment towards inter-state integration and cooperation in the sphere of secondary education. There are more than 27,000 schools in India and 240 schools in 28 foreign countries affiliated to the CBSE. All schools affiliated to CBSE follow the NCERT curriculum especially from class 9 to 12. The current Chairperson of CBSE is Nidhi Chibber, IAS.

The constitution of the Board was amended in 1952 to give its present name, the Central Board of Secondary Education. The Board was reconstituted on 1 July 1962 so as to make its services available to students and various educational institutions in the entire country.

History
The first education board to be set up in India was the Uttar Pradesh Board of High School and Intermediate Education in 1921, which was under jurisdiction of Rajputana, Central India and Gwalior. In 1929, the government of India set up a joint Board named Board of High School and Intermediate Education. This included Ajmer, Merwara, Central India, and Gwalior. Later it was confined to Ajmer, Bhopal and Vindhya Pradesh. In 1952, it became the Central Board of Secondary Education.

Languages 
CBSE offers academic subjects in 40 different languages, which are Arabic, Assamese, Bahasa Melayu, Bengali, Bhutia, Bodo, English, French, German, Gujarati, Gurung, Hindi Course-A, Hindi Course-B, Japanese, Kannada, Kashmiri, Lepcha, Limboo, Malayalam, Meitei (Manipuri), Marathi, Mizo, Nepali, Odia, Persian, Punjabi, Rai, Russian, Sanskrit, Sindhi, Spanish, Sherpa, Tamang, Tamil, Tangkhul, Telugu AP, Telugu Telangana, Thai, Tibetan, Urdu Course A and Urdu Course B.

Affiliations
CBSE affiliates all Kendriya Vidyalayas, all Jawahar Navodaya Vidyalayas, private schools, and most of the schools approved by central government of India. There are 1,138 Kendriya Vidyalayas, 3,011 Government Schools, 16,741 Independent Schools, 595 Jawahar Novodaya Vidyalayas and 14 Central Tibetan Schools.

Examinations
CBSE conducts the final examinations for Class 10 and Class 12 every year in the month of March. The results are announced by the end of May. The board earlier conducted the AIEEE Examination for admission to undergraduate courses in engineering and architecture in colleges across India, however the AIEEE exam was merged with the IIT-Joint Entrance Exam (JEE) in 2013. The common examination is now called JEE (Main) and is henceforth conducted by National Testing Agency.

CBSE also conducted AIPMT (All India Pre Medical Test) for admission to major medical colleges in India. In 2014, the conduct of the National Eligibility Test for grant of junior research fellowship and eligibility for assistant professor in institutions of higher learning was outsourced to CBSE.

Apart from these tests, CBSE also conducts the Central Teacher Eligibility Test and the Class X optional proficiency test.
With the addition of NET in 2014, the CBSE had become the largest exam conducting body in the world.

On 10 November 2017, the Union Cabinet, chaired by Prime Minister Narendra Modi, cleared a proposal for creation of a National Testing Agency (NTA) serving as the premier autonomous body for conducting entrance examinations in the country. Beginning in 2018 various exams previously conducted by the CBSE were transferred to the NTA including National Eligibility cum Entrance Test (Undergraduate), Joint Entrance Examination – Main, National Eligibility Test, Central Universities Common Entrance Test and others.

Promotion criteria

Class 10 
For promotion from Secondary level (Class IX-X) to Senior Secondary level (Class XI-XII), a student must obtain, for all subjects (or best 5 if 6 subjects are taken), 33% overall, without any minimum theory mark requirement. Originally, the passing criteria was set such that a student had to get 33% in both the theory and practical components. However, an exemption was initially granted for students writing the exam in 2018 as they went through the old CCE system in the previous year. However, CBSE later extended this relief for students writing the exam from 2019 and later as well. Students who do not manage to pass up to two subjects can write the compartment in those subjects in July. Those who fail the compartment, or fail in three subjects or more, must rewrite all the subjects taken in the next year.

Class 12 
For class 12 students the promotion criteria is 33% overall, with 33% in both theory and practical examinations (if applicable). Students who do not manage to pass in exactly one subject can write the compartment for that subject in July. Those who fail the compartment, or those who fail in two subjects or more, must rewrite all the subjects taken in the next year.

Grading 
For the Class 10 and Class 12 exams, CBSE (along with the marks obtained) includes the positional grade obtained by the student, which is dependent on the average performance of the students in that subject. Consequently, the cutoffs required to obtain a particular grade vary every year.

The cutoffs required to obtain a particular grade in 2018 are listed below:

During CCE 
During 2010–2017, when CBSE implemented a CCE (Continuous and Comprehensive Evaluation) for Class X students, only the grades obtained by the student were mentioned in the report card in a 9-point grading scale, which translates as below:

Results

2016

Moderation 

It is the practice adopted by CBSE of "tweaking" candidates' marks to account for paper difficulties and variations. This has been criticized in the past for inflating students' marks in a hyper-competitive society where even one mark counts, and CBSE is in the process of ending it. In 2017, CBSE informed that it would end moderation entirely, but its decision was challenged by a court case at the Delhi High Court, which ruled that moderation should continue for that year.

With the exception of 2018, moderation was applied to account for variations in region sets (as then students in different regions would be answering different question papers). In 2018, when everyone around the world answered the same questions, this practice was renamed as standardisation, with the CBSE gradually phasing out the practice with the reduction on subjects which were given the offset.

In 2018, Mathematics, Physics, Chemistry and Accountancy were given offset of +9, Business Studies given +6, and English given a +3 offset. In 2019, moderation took the effect of giving up to 11 extra marks:

The total mark obtained by a student through moderation cannot exceed 95; if so, it is capped at 95 unless the student's actual mark is 96 or more. This is the reason a mark of 95 is relatively common for such subjects, and why it is much tougher to get 96 than to get a 95.

Moderation was also applied in the infamous CBSE Class 12 mathematics papers of 2015 and 2016, wherein the paper created a huge furore as students and teachers complained that the paper was too tough. Despite a reportedly heavy offset of +16 (+15 for Delhi), students' marks reduced (especially for 2016), as while the A1 cutoff was stable (90), the A2 cutoff reduced to 77, with other grades also experiencing a dip in cutoff.

Moderation can also take the form of giving grace marks to enable students who have scored near the pass mark to pass. This is the reason marks between 25 and 33 are unheard of in subjects like Mathematics, and also explains why the difference between D1 and D2 cutoff is sometimes very small.

Changes for the 2019 exam

Earlier duration for vocational exams 
The CBSE has decided that vocational exams (which very few students take) are to be held earlier – in mid/late February compared to March for most other exams. This is to ensure the exams finish earlier.

More internal options 
For many core subjects, the number of internal choices (wherein students pick one to answer out of two) has increased.

English paper modifications 
The English (Core) paper of Class 12 has been modified in a bid to make it less 'speedy'.

Changes for 2020 Exam 
The Central Board of Secondary Education (CBSE) will now conduct two separate examinations for Mathematics in class 10 board examination starting from 2020 session. The current Mathematics exam is termed as Mathematics (Standard), and an easier version of Mathematics has been introduced, called as Mathematics (Basic). Students taking the latter version may not study Mathematics to any further level.

The option of choosing mathematics will be mentioned in the registration form for class 10 CBSE board examination. Candidates will be required to select their choice of test while filling the registration form for CBSE Class 10 board examination 2020.

Minister of Education, MoE (previously Minister of Human Resource Department, HRD) amid the coronavirus outbreak had ordered rescheduling of pending examinations. The exams rescheduled were to be conducted between 1 and 15 July. On 26 June, CBSE released as circular which cancelled the remaining exams and give scores based on the scores of the exams already taken by students. For some students of Delhi, who were able to give 3 or less exams were scored as per their performance in internal exams. This decision came after a judicial ruling.

Effect of COVID-19 Pandemic on 2021 & 2022 Exams 

Due to rapid increase in COVID-19 cases in country, CBSE cancelled the board exams of 10th class & postponed the 12th class exams.

Like 10th, Class 12th Board Exam 2021 has also been cancelled. Prime Minister Narendra Modi took a decision on this after a long meeting on 1 June 2021.

Later, in a letter dated 5 July 2021, CBSE announced a special scheme of assessment for board examination of classes X and XII for the session 2021–22 in which the academic year was divided into 2 terms with approximately 50% syllabus in each term to increase the probability of boards being conducted by CBSE and to avoid depending on schools for declaring results.

The Term 1 examination was successfully conducted by CBSE in objective mode from 22 November to 12 December 2021 for Class 10 and from 16 November to 30 December 2021 for Class 12. However, the Term-I examination was criticised by many for having wrong answer keys, tough question papers and wrong or controversial questions with a question being dropped in Sociology exam of class 12 and a paragraph in English Language and Literature exam for class 10 by CBSE following which CBSE dropped the experts who set the Sociology and English paper from paper-setting panels. The Term 2 examination were conducted from 26 April 2022 for both Class 10 and 12 and ended on 24 May for Class 10 and 15 June for Class 12.The results of Class 12 were declared on July 22, 2022 followed by the declaration of Class 10 results on the same day.

2018 question paper leak
In March 2018, there were reports that CBSE Class 10 mathematics and Class 12 economics question papers were leaked. In response, CBSE announced that these exams will be cancelled and re-exams will be conducted. However, CBSE later announced that there will be no re-exam for Class 10 mathematics paper because the paper leak may have been confined to a few alleged beneficiaries.

On 7 April 2018, economics teacher Rakesh Kumar and two other employees of a private school in Una, Himachal Pradesh were arrested for leaking the Class 12 economics paper. According to the police, Rakesh Kumar had gone inside the strong room of a bank to pick up packets of computer science question papers but also picked up a packet of economics question paper. He asked a student to make a handwritten copy of the question paper (to avoid being traced from the handwriting). He then sent photos of the handwritten copy of the paper on WhatsApp to a relative in Punjab. This relative shared the photos with her son and nephew, who shared them with their friends on WhatsApp groups, from where it was forwarded to other Whatsapp groups. On 12 April 2018, the police said that Rakesh Kumar, who leaked the class 12 economics paper, had leaked class 10 mathematics paper also. Consequently, the Central Board of Secondary Education has put in place a system of "encrypted" question papers, which are supposed to be printed by the schools half an hour before the exam starts.

Regional offices

Foreign Schools

According to the official website of CBSE, there are 28 government as well as private affiliated schools in different countries outside India. The reason of their establishment is largely serving the Indian community abroad, or at least, children or relative of Indian diplomats.

Present Countries

 
 

For countries where the population of Indian nationals even surpasses the country's native population or in countries where they form a substantial share of the population, like Saudi Arabia, the United Arab Emirates, Oman, Qatar, Bahrain, etc., Indian embassies have set up CBSE schools and have allowed Indians or locals to set up private CBSE schools serving the needs of Indians in that particular country.

But, however, in countries where Indians do not reside, the Indian diplomatic missions have set up schools in countries like Russia and Iran which mainly serves children of diplomats.

See also

CBSE expression series – an essay/painting competition aimed to make students aware of the history of women and men who have served the nation of India
Council for the Indian School Certificate Examinations (CISCE)
National Institute of Open Schooling (NIOS)
Secondary School Leaving Certificate (SSLC)
Junior Science Talent Search Examination
Rashtriya Vidyalaya Sangathan
Uttarakhand Board of School Education(UBSE)

References

External links

 

 
Secondary education in India
High school course levels
School accreditors
Ministry of Education (India)
Educational institutions established in 1962
1962 establishments in Delhi